Eugenio González Rojas (born January 23, 1903 – August 28, 1976) was a Chilean philosopher, scholar, politician and writer. He was a founding member of the Chilean Socialist Party as well as its theoretician.

He has been commonly cited as an inspiration by Chilean left-wing intellectuals, scholars and politicians. In 2014, the left-wing organization Nodo XXI established a school of political leaders baptized with his name.

Biography
Later, he was elected as president of the University of Chile Student Federation (FECh).

In 1933, alongside Oscar Schnake, with whom showed his anarchist affiliation, founded the collective  (ARS). Then, this association and another three merged into the current Socialist Party of Chile in April 1933. Thereby, he was a founder member next to Marmaduke Grove, Eugenio Matte, Salvador Allende and Schnake.

In 1971, he was appointed as general manager of Televisión Nacional de Chile by then President Allende.

References

Further reading

External links
 Profile at Biblioteca Nacional del Congreso

1903 births
1976 deaths
Chilean people
Chilean philosophers
Socialist Party of Chile politicians
University of Chile alumni
Heads of universities in Chile